Lucas Agustín Besozzi (born 22 January 2003) is an Argentine professional footballer who plays as a left winger for Central Córdoba SdE, on loan from Lanús.

Career
Besozzi came through the youth ranks at Lanús. He was promoted into the senior set-up at the age of seventeen in 2020, with manager Luis Zubeldía calling him up for pre-season; as he notably featured in a friendly defeat to Vélez Sarsfield in October, having signed a contract two months prior. Besozzi's competitive debut soon arrived on 6 December, with the forward replacing Franco Orozco with twenty-five minutes remaining of a Copa de la Liga Profesional loss away to Newell's Old Boys; he had been an unused substitute four times in the preceding month or so.

On 10 February 2022, Besozzi joined Central Córdoba SdE on a dry loan until the end of 2022.

Career statistics
.

Notes

References

External links

2003 births
Living people
Sportspeople from Lanús
Argentine people of Italian descent
Argentine footballers
Association football wingers
Argentine Primera División players
Club Atlético Lanús footballers
Central Córdoba de Santiago del Estero footballers